Sainik School Amaravathinagar is a  Boys and Girls English medium, residential public school with a military bias up to +2 stage as per the CBSE board  Syllabus. It is one of the 33 Government aided Sainik Schools in India, located in Udumalpet , Trirupur distrist of Tamil Nadu.

History
Sainik School, Amaravathi Nagar, was started in 16 Jul 1962 as part of the Sainik School society. It was called Sainik School, Madras (SSM) until 1975. Sainik School, Amaravathinagar, was formed with the objective of training cadets to join the National Defence Academy - NDA (NDA provides combined training for the cadets entering into all the three forces in India). Indian naval academy (INA) which provides training for the naval cadets entering into the Indian Navy.

Students are selected through an entrance examination (All India sainik school entrance exam-AISSEE),(written then a medical test and an interview) for the entry into 6th and 9th standard and the selected candidates are given public school education. The cadets with leadership skills are trained to become officers in the Army, Navy and Air Force. Only Indian citizens are eligible for entry into the school.

Aim
 The aim of the school is to prepare the boys academically, physically and psychologically for entry into the National Defence Academy or other walks of life.

School colors and crest
The school colors are steel grey and blood red. Grey stands for strength and red for devotion to duty and comradeship. In the school crest, the swords represents valour and the lamp stands for knowledge and wisdom. The gopuram symbolises the culture and genius of Tamil Nadu.

Campus
The school campus occupies  in the Indira Gandhi National Park's valley. Surrounded by mountains on all sides the campus is seen against the backdrop of the Amaravathi Dam

Academics
The education in the school follows state board pattern and the examinations provided by this system.

Athletics and extracurriculars
Football, hockey, volleyball, basketball, cricket, athletics, cross-country running, swimming,  gymnastics, canoeing, cycling, horse riding, mountaineering, parasailing, trekking (hiking), obstacles course, rifle shooting, boxing, NCC, karate, music clubs, literary clubs, theater arts, elocution, photography, fine arts, craftwork, philately, aero-modeling, ship-modeling, Marching band, Choir

Culture and social life
 Present day students and the alumni call themselves Amaravians.
 Houses / dormitory:
 Chera - blue - Bow and Arrow
 Chola - red  - Tiger
 Pandya - yellow - Golden Fish
 Pallava - green - Lion
 Feeder Houses ( only for Class 6)
 Valluvar - all the students of Pandya and Pallava houses are admitted into Valluvar house in 6th Std.
 Bharathi - all the students of Chera and Chola houses are admitted into Bharathi house in 6th Std.
 Students from 6th std will be in either housed in Valluvar or Bharathi houses based on their houses. Students are divided into four houses namely Chera, Chola, Pandya and Pallava from 6th Std onwards. 7th std to 9th std Students are in respective junior houses and 10th std to 12th std students are in respective senior houses.
 School badge: SSA
 Uniform: khaki blue-grey
 School day celebration is celebrated over two days every year in December.
 Students have three vacations every year. Diwali  Vacation is decided upon the day when the festival occurs.  Summer vacation are from the 1st week of April until last week of May. Pongal Break is on the 3rd week of January month.
 Inter house competitions are held throughout the year. Each house gets points based on their performance. The house which gets most points at the end of the year will be winner of the year.
 The school has a cinema hall called 'Sahni' named after the first principal of the school.
 The school has a  library and reading room with magazines and periodicals.
 The school has also the privilege of producing national level athletes like Vigneshwaran M, P Thomas, Danish Esaw and many more legends.

School information
 Joining NDA is an ambition for most of the students.
 NDA selection is done in two stages by a single competitive examination for all the three forces followed by an interview conducted by  the Services Selection Board
 An entrance examination is conducted to select students which is open for students from across the country.

Faculty
The average education of the faculty teacher is Master's degree in their disciplines and Master of Education. The faculty and staff  help in the extra/co-curricular activities of the school. Senior master is Maths master Mr. S. Paulraj. All the staff and faculty live within the school campus or in Amaravathinagar.
 Mr P. Chandiran (Chemistry Master) and Mr A. Soundararajan (Asst. Master in Biology) were awarded the best teacher award by the President of India in the year 2011 and 2013, respectively.
The school academic campus has a Harvard/Texan T-6 warbird preserved for display.
 Faculty and staff children (boys and girls) are admitted as day scholars.

Amar Sainik
Amar Sainik Nursery and Primary school came into being in 1985 to help the Sainik staff children and to help the nearby village people. It started with 50 children. The strength of the school is about 250 children (200 boys and 50 girls).

See also
 Indian Naval Academy
 Air force academy
 Officers Training Academy
 Indian Military Academy

References

External links
Official website
Official Alumni Website (Amaravian Alumni Association)
plane
A video about Sainik school at Jawantv.info

Sainik schools
Military high schools
Boys' schools in India
Boarding schools in Tamil Nadu
High schools and secondary schools in Tamil Nadu
Tiruppur district
Educational institutions established in 1962
1962 establishments in Madras State